George Melville Seiders (January 15, 1844 – May 26, 1915) was an American lawyer and politician from Maine.

Early life
Seiders was born and raised on a farm in Union, Maine. In 1862 at the age of 18, he joined the 24th Maine Volunteer Infantry Regiment in Augusta, Maine. He and his regiment spent most of their 9 months of military service in Louisiana. Of particular note, the 24th Maine participated in the Siege of Port Hudson. The regiment mustered out in August 1863.

Politics
Seiders, a Republican, served as a member of the Maine House of Representatives from North Yarmouth, Maine in 1878. In his first term, he was assigned to that body's important Judiciary Committee.

In 1880, he moved to Portland, Maine, where he resided for the remainder of his life. In 1892 and 1894, Seiders was elected to the Maine Senate. During his second term, he was elected by his colleagues as the President of the Senate. In 1901, he was elected Maine Attorney General, a position he held until 1904.

He died in Portland on May 26, 1915.

References

1844 births
1915 deaths
People from Union, Maine
People from North Yarmouth, Maine
Politicians from Portland, Maine
People of Maine in the American Civil War
Bowdoin College alumni
Maine lawyers
Presidents of the Maine Senate
Maine Attorneys General
19th-century American lawyers